Future of mankind may refer to:

 "Future of Mankind", a song from Artificial Intelligence (EP)
 "The Future of Mankind", a book by Pierre Teilhard de Chardin
 "The Future of Mankind", a publication by M. Aram 
 "The Future of Mankind", a publication by Karl Jaspers

See also
 Race of the future